

A 
A System of Logic --
A priori and a posteriori --
Abacus logic --
Abduction (logic) --
Abductive validation --
Academia Analitica --
Accuracy and precision --
Ad captandum --
Ad hoc hypothesis --
Ad hominem --
Affine logic --
Affirming the antecedent --
Affirming the consequent --
Algebraic logic --
Ambiguity --
Analysis --
Analysis (journal) --
Analytic reasoning --
Analytic–synthetic distinction --
Anangeon --
Anecdotal evidence --
Antecedent (logic) --
Antepredicament --
Anti-psychologism --
Antinomy --
Apophasis --
Appeal to probability --
Appeal to ridicule --
Archive for Mathematical Logic --
Arché --
Argument --
Argument by example --
Argument form --
Argument from authority --
Argument map --
Argumentation theory --
Argumentum ad baculum --
Argumentum e contrario --
Ariadne's thread (logic) --
Aristotelian logic --
Aristotle --
Association for Informal Logic and Critical Thinking --
Association for Logic, Language and Information --
Association for Symbolic Logic --
Attacking Faulty Reasoning --
Australasian Association for Logic --
Axiom --
Axiom independence --
Axiom of reducibility --
Axiomatic system --
Axiomatization --

B 
Backward chaining --
Barcan formula --
Begging the question --
Begriffsschrift --
Belief --
Belief bias --
Belief revision --
Benson Mates --
Bertrand Russell Society --
Biconditional elimination --
Biconditional introduction --
Bivalence and related laws --
Blue and Brown Books --
Boole's syllogistic --
Boolean algebra (logic) --
Boolean algebra (structure) --
Boolean network --

C 
Canonical form --
Canonical form (Boolean algebra) --
Cartesian circle --
Case-based reasoning --
Categorical logic --
Categories (Aristotle) --
Categories (Peirce) --
Category mistake --
Catuṣkoṭi --
Circular definition --
Circular reasoning --
Circular reference --
Circular reporting --
Circumscription (logic) --
Circumscription (taxonomy) --
Classical logic --
Clocked logic --
Cognitive bias --
Cointerpretability --
Colorless green ideas sleep furiously --
Combinational logic --
Combinatory logic --
Combs method --
Common knowledge (logic) --
Commutativity of conjunction --
Completeness (logic) --
Composition of Causes --
Compossibility --
Comprehension (logic) --
Computability logic --
Concept --
Conceptualism --
Condensed detachment --
Conditional disjunction --
Conditional probability --
Conditional proof --
Conditional quantifier --
Confirmation bias --
Conflation --
Confusion of the inverse --
Conjunction elimination --
Conjunction fallacy --
Conjunction introduction --
Conjunctive normal form --
Connexive logic --
Connotation --
Consequent --
Consistency --
Constructive dilemma --
Contra principia negantem non est disputandum --
Contradiction --
Contrapositive --
Control logic --
Conventionalism --
Converse (logic) --
Converse Barcan formula --
Correlative-based fallacies --
Counterexample --
Counterfactual conditional --
Counterintuitive --
Cratylism --
Credibility --
Criteria of truth --
Critical-Creative Thinking and Behavioral Research Laboratory --
Critical pedagogy --
Critical reading --
Critical thinking --
Critique of Pure Reason --
Curry's paradox --
Cyclic negation --

D 
Dagfinn Føllesdal --
De Interpretatione --
De Morgan's laws --
Decidability (logic) --
Decidophobia --
Decision making --
Decisional balance sheet --
Deductive closure --
Deduction theorem --
Deductive fallacy --
Deductive reasoning --
Default logic --
Defeasible logic --
Defeasible reasoning --
Definable set --
Definist fallacy --
Definition --
Definitions of logic --
Degree of truth --
Denying the antecedent --
Denying the correlative --
Deontic logic --
Description --
Description logic --
Descriptive fallacy --
Deviant logic --
Dharmakirti --
Diagrammatic reasoning --
Dialectica --
Dialectica space --
Dialetheism --
Dichotomy --
Difference (philosophy) --
Digital timing diagram --
Dignāga --
Dilemma --
Disjunction elimination --
Disjunction introduction --
Disjunctive normal form --
Disjunctive syllogism --
Dispositional and occurrent belief --
Disquotational principle --
Dissoi logoi --
Division of Logic, Methodology, and Philosophy of Science --
Don't-care term --
Donald Davidson (philosopher) --
Double counting (fallacy) --
Double negation --
Double negative --
Double negation elimination --
Doxa --
Drinking the Kool-Aid --

E 
EL++ --
Ecological fallacy --
Effective method --
Elimination rule --
Emotional reasoning --
Emotions in decision-making --
Empty name --
Encyclopedia of the Philosophical Sciences --
End term --
Engineered language --
Entailment --
Entitative graph --
Enumerative definition --
Epicureanism --
Epilogism --
Epistemic closure --
Equisatisfiability --
Erotetics --
Eternal statement --
Etymological fallacy --
European Summer School in Logic, Language and Information --
Evidence --
Exclusive nor --
Exclusive or --
Existential fallacy --
Existential graph --
Existential quantification --
Expert --
Explanandum --
Explanation --
Explanatory power --
Extension (semantics) --
Extensional context --
Extensional definition --

F 
Fa (concept) --
Fact --
Fallacies of definition --
Fallacy --
Fallacy of distribution --
Fallacy of four terms --
Fallacy of quoting out of context --
Fallacy of the four terms --
False attribution --
False dilemma --
False equivalence --
False premise --
Fictionalism --
Finitary relation --
Finite model property --
First-order logic --
First-order predicate --
First-order predicate calculus --
First-order resolution --
Fitch-style calculus --
Fluidic logic --
Fluidics --
Formal fallacy --
Formal ontology --
Formal system --
Formalism (philosophy) --
Forward chaining --
Free logic --
Free variables and bound variables --
Function and Concept --
Fuzzy logic --

G 
Game semantics --
Ganto's Ax --
Geometry of interaction --
Gilles-Gaston Granger --
Gongsun Long --
Grammaticality --
Greedy reductionism --
Grundlagen der Mathematik --

H 
HPO formalism --
Halo effect --
Handbook of Automated Reasoning --
Hanlon's razor --
Hasty generalization --
Herbrandization --
Hetucakra --
Heyting algebra --
Higher-order predicate --
Higher-order thinking --
Historian's fallacy --
Historical fallacy --
History of logic --
History of the function concept --
Hold come what may --
Homunculus argument --
Horn clause --
Hume's fork --
Hume's principle --
Hypothetical syllogism --

I 
Identity (philosophy) --
Identity of indiscernibles --
Idola fori --
Idola specus --
Idola theatri --
Idola tribus --
If-by-whiskey --
Iff --
Illicit major --
Illicit minor --
Illuminationism --
Immutable truth --
Imperative logic --
Implicant --
Inclusion (logic) --
Incomplete comparison --
Inconsistent comparison --
Inconsistent triad --
Independence-friendly logic --
Indian logic --
Inductive logic --
Inductive logic programming --
Inference --
Inference procedure --
Inference rule --
Inferential role semantics --
Infinitary logic --
Infinite regress --
Infinity --
Informal fallacy --
Informal logic --
Inquiry --
Inquiry (philosophy journal) --
Insolubilia --
Institute for Logic, Language and Computation --
Intellectual responsibility --
Intended interpretation --
Intension --
Intensional fallacy --
Intensional logic --
Intensional statement --
Intentional Logic --
Intermediate logic --
Interpretability --
Interpretability logic --
Interpretive discussion --
Introduction rule --
Introduction to Mathematical Philosophy --
Intuitionistic linear logic --
Intuitionistic logic --
Invalid proof --
Inventor's paradox --
Inverse (logic) --
Inverse consequences --
Irreducibility --
Is Logic Empirical? --
Isagoge --
Ivor Grattan-Guinness --

J 
Jacobus Naveros --
Jayanta Bhatta --
Jingle-jangle fallacies --
John Corcoran (logician) --
John W. Dawson, Jr --
Journal of Applied Non-Classical Logics --
Journal of Automated Reasoning --
Journal of Logic, Language and Information --
Journal of Logic and Computation --
Journal of Mathematical Logic --
Journal of Philosophical Logic --
Journal of Symbolic Logic --
Judgment (mathematical logic) --
Judgmental language --
Just-so story --

K 
Karnaugh map --
Kinetic logic --
Knowing and the Known --
Kripke semantics --
Kurt Gödel Society --

L 
Language --
Language, Proof and Logic --
Lateral thinking --
Law of excluded middle --
Law of identity --
Law of non-contradiction --
Law of noncontradiction --
Law of thought --
Laws of Form --
Laws of logic --
Leap of faith --
Lemma (logic) --
Lexical definition --
Linear logic --
Linguistic and Philosophical Investigations --
Linguistics and Philosophy --
List of fallacies --
List of incomplete proofs --
List of logic journals --
List of paradoxes --
Logic --
Logic Lane --
Logic Spectacles --
Logic gate --
Logic in China --
Logic in Islamic philosophy --
Logic of class --
Logic of information --
Logic programming --
Logica Universalis --
Logica nova --
Logical Analysis and History of Philosophy --
Logical Investigations (Husserl) --
Logical Methods in Computer Science --
Logical abacus --
Logical argument --
Logical assertion --
Logical atomism --
Logical biconditional --
Logical conditional --
Logical conjunction --
Logical constant --
Logical disjunction --
Logical equality --
Logical equivalence --
Logical extreme --
Logical form --
Logical harmony --
Logical holism --
Logical nand --
Logical nor --
Logical operator --
Logical quality --
Logical truth --
Logicism --
Logico-linguistic modeling --
Logos --
Loosely associated statements --
Łoś–Tarski preservation theorem --
Ludic fallacy --
Lwów–Warsaw school of logic --

M 
Main contention --
Major term --
Markov's principle --
Martin Gardner bibliography --
Masked-man fallacy --
Material conditional --
Mathematical fallacy --
Mathematical logic --
Meaning (linguistics) --
Meaning (non-linguistic) --
Meaning (philosophy of language) --
Meaningless statement --
Megarian school --
Mental model theory of reasoning --
Mereology --
Meta-communication --
Metalanguage --
Metalogic --
Metamathematics --
Metasyntactic variable --
Metatheorem --
Metavariable --
Middle term --
Minimal axioms for Boolean algebra --
Minimal logic --
Minor premise --
Miscellanea Logica --
Missing dollar riddle --
Modal fallacy --
Modal fictionalism --
Modal logic --
Model theory --
Modus ponens --
Modus tollens --
Moral reasoning --
Motivated reasoning --
Moving the goalposts --
Multigrade predicate --
Multi-valued logic --
Multiple-conclusion logic --
Mutatis mutandis --
Mutual knowledge (logic) --
Mutually exclusive events --
Münchhausen trilemma --

N 
Naive set theory --
Name --
Narrative logic --
Natural deduction --
Natural kind --
Natural language --
Necessary and sufficient --
Necessity and sufficiency --
Negation --
Neutrality (philosophy) --
Nirvana fallacy --
Nixon diamond --
No true Scotsman --
Nominal identity --
Non-Aristotelian logic --
Non-classical logic --
Non-monotonic logic --
Non-rigid designator --
Non sequitur (logic) --
Noneism --
Nonfirstorderizability --
Nordic Journal of Philosophical Logic --
Normal form (natural deduction) --
Novum Organum --
Nyaya --
Nyāya Sūtras --

O 
Object of the mind --
Occam's razor --
On Formally Undecidable Propositions of Principia Mathematica and Related Systems --
One-sided argument --
Ontological commitment --
Open sentence --
Opinion --
Opposing Viewpoints series --
Ordered logic --
Organon --
Original proof of Gödel's completeness theorem --
Osmund Lewry --
Ostensive definition --
Outline of logic --
Overbelief --

P 
Package-deal fallacy --
Panlogism --
Paraconsistent logic --
Paraconsistent logics --
Parade of horribles --
Paradox --
Pars destruens/pars construens --
Pathetic fallacy --
Persuasive definition --
Peter Simons (academic) --
Philosophia Mathematica --
Philosophical logic --
Philosophy of logic --
Peirce's law --
Plural quantification --
Poisoning the well --
Polarity item --
Polish Logic --
Polish notation --
Politician's syllogism --
Polychotomous key --
Polylogism --
Polysyllogism --
Port-Royal Logic --
Possible world --
Post's lattice --
Post disputation argument --
Post hoc ergo propter hoc --
Posterior Analytics --
Practical syllogism --
Pragmatic mapping --
Pragmatic maxim --
Pragmatic theory of truth --
Pramāṇa --
Pramāṇa-samuccaya --
Precising definition --
Precision questioning --
Predicable --
Predicate (logic) --
Predicate abstraction --
Predicate logic --
Preferential entailment --
Preintuitionism --
Prescriptivity --
Presentism (literary and historical analysis) --
Presupposition --
Principia Mathematica --
Principle of bivalence --
Principle of explosion --
Principle of nonvacuous contrast --
Principle of sufficient reason --
Principles of Mathematical Logic --
Prior Analytics --
Private Eye Project --
Pro hominem --
Probabilistic logic --
Probabilistic logic network --
Problem of future contingents --
Problem of induction --
Process of elimination --
Project Reason --
Proof-theoretic semantics --
Proof (truth) --
Proof by assertion --
Proof theory --
Propaganda techniques --
Proposition --
Propositional calculus --
Propositional function --
Propositional representation --
Propositional variable --
Prosecutor's fallacy --
Provability logic --
Proving too much --
Prudence --
Pseudophilosophy --
Psychologism --
Psychologist's fallacy --

Q 
Q.E.D. --
Quantification --
Quantization (linguistics) --
Quantum logic --

R 
Ramism --
Rationality --
Razor (philosophy) --
Reason --
Reductio ad absurdum --
Reference --
Reflective equilibrium --
Regression fallacy --
Regular modal logic --
Reification (fallacy) --
Relativist fallacy --
Relevance --
Relevance logic --
Relevant logic --
Remarks on the Foundations of Mathematics --
Retroduction --
Retrospective determinism --
Revolutions in Mathematics --
Rhetoric --
Rigour --
Rolandas Pavilionis --
Round square copula --
Rudolf Carnap --
Rule of inference --
Rvachev function --

S 
SEE-I --
Salva congruitate --
Salva veritate --
Satisfiability --
Scholastic logic --
School of Names --
Science of Logic --
Scientific temper --
Second-order predicate --
Segment addition postulate --
Self-reference --
Self-refuting idea --
Self-verifying theories --
Semantic theory of truth --
Semantics --
Sense and reference --
Sequent --
Sequent calculus --
Sequential logic --
Set (mathematics) --
Seven Types of Ambiguity (Empson) --
Sheffer stroke --
Ship of Theseus --
Simple non-inferential passage --
Singular term --
Situation --
Situational analysis --
Skeptic's Toolbox --
Slingshot argument --
Social software (social procedure) --
Socratic questioning --
Soku hi --
Some Remarks on Logical Form --
Sophism --
Sophistical Refutations --
Soundness --
Source credibility --
Source criticism --
Special case --
Specialization (logic) --
Speculative reason --
Spurious relationship --
Square of opposition --
State of affairs (philosophy) --
Statement (logic) --
Straight and Crooked Thinking --
Straight face test --
Straw man --
Strength (mathematical logic) --
Strict conditional --
Strict implication --
Strict logic --
Structural rule --
Studia Logica --
Studies in Logic, Grammar and Rhetoric --
Subjective logic --
Substitution (logic) --
Substructural logic --
Sufficient condition --
Sum of Logic --
Sunk costs --
Supertask --
Supervaluationism --
Supposition theory --
Survivorship bias --
Syllogism --
Syllogistic fallacy --
Symbol (formal) --
Syntactic Structures --
Syntax (logic) --
Synthese --
Systems of Logic Based on Ordinals --

T 
T-schema --
Tacit assumption --
Tarski's undefinability theorem --
Tautology (logic) --
Temporal logic --
Temporal parts --
Teorema (journal) --
Term (argumentation) --
Term logic --
Ternary logic --
Testability --
Tetralemma --
Textual case based reasoning --
The False Subtlety of the Four Syllogistic Figures --
The Foundations of Arithmetic --
The Geography of Thought --
The Laws of Thought --
The Paradoxes of the Infinite --
Theorem --
Theoretical definition --
Theory and Decision --
Theory of justification --
Theory of obligationes --
Third-cause fallacy --
Three men make a tiger --
Tolerance (in logic) --
Topical logic --
Topics (Aristotle) --
Tractatus Logico-Philosophicus --
Train of thought --
Trairūpya --
Transferable belief model --
Transparent Intensional Logic --
TregoED --
Trikonic --
Trilemma --
Trivial objections --
Trivialism --
Truth --
Truth-bearer --
Truth condition --
Truth function --
Truth value --
Truthiness --
Truthmaker --
Type (model theory) --
Type theory --
Type–token distinction --

U 
Ultrafinitism --
Unification (computer science) --
Unifying theories in mathematics --
Uniqueness quantification --
Universal logic --
Universal quantification --
Univocity --
Unspoken rule --
Use–mention distinction --

V 
Vacuous truth --
Vagrant predicate --
Vagueness --
Validity --
Valuation-based system --
Van Gogh fallacy --
Venn diagram --
Vicious circle principle --

W 
Warnier/Orr diagram --
Well-formed formula --
What the Tortoise Said to Achilles --
Willard Van Orman Quine --
William Kneale --
Window operator --
Wisdom of repugnance --
Witness (mathematics) --
Word sense --

Z 
Zhegalkin polynomial --

See also

 List of logicians
 List of rules of inference
 List of mathematical logic topics
 There is a list of paradoxes on the paradox page.
 There is a list of fallacies on the logical fallacy page.
 Modern mathematical logic is at the list of mathematical logic topics page.
 For introductory set theory and other supporting material see the list of basic discrete mathematics topics.

Logic
 1
Logic